Michael Tsegaye (born 1975 in Addis Ababa) is an Ethiopian artist and photographer.  Much of his work presents a glimpse of life in contemporary Ethiopia, although an extended catalogue of his images come from his travels abroad.

Biography 

Michael Tsegaye grew up in Addis Ababa where he attended Cathedral Elementary and Tikur Anbessa High School. He enrolled in the Economics Department of Addis Abeba University before transferring to its School of Fine Arts and Design.  There, he received his diploma in painting in 2002, but soon gave up painting after he developed a severe allergy to oil paint.  He subsequently found his passion in photography.

Michael Tsegaye has regularly worked for international publications such as Der Spiegel, Jeune Afrique, and enorm; as well as the press agencies Bloomberg and Reuters. He has also worked for a number of international NGOs in a variety of countries and capacities since 2006, including Médecins Sans Frontières, UNESCO and GIZ. In particular from 2007 to 2008 he was employed with a year-long contract with GIZ’s Engineering Capacity Building Project (ECBP) in Addis Ababa.

Besides his professional work, Michael is also a well-known artist who focuses on social documentary and art photography. He has exhibited in various galleries in New York, Paris, Berlin, Madrid, Morocco, Canada, Amsterdam, Mali, Miami, and São Paulo. His work can be found in a number of international magazines and various catalogues including Snap Judgments: New Directions in African Photography, edited by Okwui Enwezor, and published by the International Centre for Photography in New York City in 2007.

Publications and features (selected)

 2014
 "Feature." New York Times Lens Blog: The Changing of Ethiopia. Web. 12 May 2014.
 2013
 "Interview." The Guardian: Ethiopia seen outside the box. Web. 9 September 2013.
 "Feature." CNN.com: Hotshots: Africa's most exciting new photographers. Web. 24 Oct. 2013.
 2012
 "Interview." SAVVY Journal for Critical Texts on Contemporary African Art, 4th ed. “Curating: Expectations and Challenges” Web. 1 Dec. 2012.
 2011
 "Ankober, mystic." Callaloo 33.1 (2010): 290-294. Project MUSE. Web. 22 Jan. 2011.
 "Ohne Gott uhnd ohne Fusel." Der Spiegel. 9/2011.
 2009
 Im blauen Lichtder Zukunft, DIE ZEIT, 29 January 2009
 Ethiopia Shuts Down Coffee Exporters, New York Times Monday, April 6, 2009
 2008
 Front cover, World Heritage Magazine, nos 51, October 2008
 2004
 Front cover image African Politics magazine (France)

Awards 
In 2011, Michael Tsegaye won the first place award for the European Union-African Union Professional Photography Competition as a representative for Eastern Africa.  He was also an artist-in-residence at the Thami Mnyele Foundation in 2010.

Exhibited works

Group exhibitions 
 2012
 Future Makers, National Museum. Addis Ababa, Ethiopia. 
 Offside Effects, Triennale. Tbilisi, Georgia.
 Temoine: Witness, Goethe Cultural Institute. Johannesburg, South Africa.
 Face2Face, BOZAR/European Union (AU Summit/Lela Gallery). Addis Abeba, Ethiopia.
 2011
 For a Sustainable World, Rencontres de Bamako, African Photography Biennial 9th Edition. Bamako, Mali.
 Photoquai 2011, Musée du quai Branly. Paris, France.
 Neoscape, Atelier Gallery. Addis Abeba, Ethiopia.
 2010
 African Journey, Galerie Sanaa. Utrecht, Netherlands.
 Selam Arts Festival. Toronto, Canada.
 Visual Arts: Africa-World. Luanda, Angola.
 Arte invisible/ARCO. Madrid, Spain.
 H*tel Dystopia Room #25/55: Al Bastakiya Art Fair. Dubai, UAE.
 2009
 Aksum Rediscovered: the Reinstallation of the Obelisk, UNESCO House. Paris, France.
 Sicherheit Entwickeln–Entwicklung Sichern, GTZ House. Berlin, Germany.
 Spot on …Bamako VII. Rencontres Africaines de la Photographie, Institute for 2009: Foreign Cultural Relations. Berlin and Stuttgart, Germany.
 2008
 Snap Judgments: Nieuwe standpunten in hedendaagse Afrikaans fotografie / New Positions in Contemporary African Photography, Het Stedelijk 2008 : 2008 : Museum. Amsterdam, Netherlands.
 Snap Judgments : New Positions in Contemporary African Photography, Brooks 2008 : Museum of Art. Memphis, TN, U.S.A.
 2007
 Africa=Hot,  Oude Kerk, World Press Photo Exhibition. Amsterdam, Netherlands.
 Africa=Hot, Tour & Taxis, World Press Photo Exhibition. Brussels, Belgium.
 VII Rencontres Afrcaines de la photographie: In the city and beyond. Bamako, Mali.
 Ethiopia on the Move, National Museum of Ethnology. Leiden, Netherlands.
 Engineering Tomorrow, Addis Ababa University, Faculty of Technology. Addis Ababa, Ethiopia.
 Snap Judgments: New Positions in Contemporary African Photography. Museo Tamayo. Mexico City, Mexico.
 2006
 Snap Judgments: New Positions in Contemporary African Photography. Miami Art Central. Miami, Florida, USA.
 Snap Judgments: New Positions in Contemporary African Photography. International Centre of Photography. New York, USA.
 Kwas Meda,  Goethe-Institute, Gebrekristos Desta Centre. Addis Ababa, Ethiopia.
 2005
 Religious Ceremonies, Royal Netherlands Embassy. Addis Ababa, Ethiopia.
 Colours In Us, Alliance Éthio-Française. Dire Dawa, Ethiopia.
 2004
 Expressions 2, Bulgarian Embassy. Addis Ababa, Ethiopia.  
 Guramayle, Alem Art Gallery. Addis Ababa, Ethiopia.
 Expressions, Alem Art Gallery. Addis Ababa, Ethiopia.
 Art for Solidarity, German School. Addis Ababa, Ethiopia. 
 2003
 Foreign, Goethe-Institute, Gebrekristos Desta Centre. Addis Ababa, Ethiopia.
 Self-portrait, Alliance Éthio-Française. Addis Ababa, Ethiopia.
 Faces and Identities, Goethe-Institute. Gebrekristos Desta Centre, Addis Ababa.

Solo exhibitions 
 2011
 Medecins Sans Frontiers, National Museum. Addis Abeba, Ethiopia.
 2008
 Made in Ethiopia, GTZ Headquarters. Frankfurt, Germany.
 2007
 Facets, Economic Commission for Africa. Addis Ababa, Ethiopia.
 Made in Ethiopia, Engineering Capacity Building Program (ecbp). Addis Ababa, Ethiopia.
 2003
 Out of the Blue, Goethe-Institute, Gebrekristos Desta Centre. Addis Ababa, Ethiopia.
 2002
 Visions of Addis, Goethe-Institute, Gebrekristos Desta Centre, Addis Ababa, Ethiopia.

References

External links 
 Michael Tsegaye : Official Website
 Michael Tsegaye (ethiopianphotographer.com): Blog
 Interview - Future Memories Part 1  | Part 2: The Leica Camera Blog
 "Fighting forgotten tropical diseases"  BBC News - In Pictures. 2012.
 archive 2011 - le Journal de la Photographie "Working Girls" Photoquai 2011.
 "The Bathers." Culture and Climate Change, Goethe Institute.
 Interview.  Africultures.com. 2010.
 Ethiopian photography.

Addis Ababa University alumni
People from Addis Ababa
Ethiopian photographers
Ethiopian artists
Living people
1975 births